Marco Wolfinger (born 18 April 1989) is a Liechtensteiner footballer who currently plays for FC Balzers.

International career
He is a member of the Liechtenstein national football team, making his debut in a 2022–23 UEFA Nations League match against Latvia on 6 June 2022. Wolfinger also made three appearances for the Liechtenstein U21.

Personal life
Marco is the oldest of three Wolfinger brothers to have been capped by the Liechtenstein senior team along with Sandro and Fabio.

References

1989 births
Living people
Liechtenstein footballers
Association football defenders
Liechtenstein international footballers
FC Balzers players
Place of birth missing (living people)